The Friedrichshafen FF.19 was an unarmed maritime reconnaissance floatplane built for the Imperial German Navy's Naval Air Service that was produced by Flugzeugbau Friedrichshafen. Built in small numbers, the aircraft first flew in 1914 and saw service during the early months of World War I, mostly conducting maritime patrols over the North Sea, although they did attack British ships participating in the Raid on Cuxhaven at the end of the year.

Background and description
The German Naval Air Service was impressed by a demonstration of the British Avro 503 single-engined floatplane in 1913 and bought the prototype. It then a ordered a batch of five aircraft, plus one airframe for static testing, of similar performance and configuration in February 1914. The first airframe completed passed the static load requirement on 2 May when its wing failed at a loading of 7.02 times the force of gravity (g)s.
 
The FF.19 was a two-seat biplane with a water-cooled  Mercedes D.I straight-six engine mounted at the front of the fuselage. The two forward floats were attached to the fuselage by four pairs of V-shaped struts while the third float was connected directly to the tail structure. The wings were connected with six sets of interplane struts that gave the aircraft a three-bay configuration. It was unarmed, although some small bombs could be stored in the observer's cockpit.

Operational History
The first batch of aircraft were delivered in May–June 1914 and the FF.19 became the first German aircraft to conduct successful tests with wireless telegraphy. When World War I began in August, the five Friedrichshafens and three AGO floatplanes were the only combat-worthy aircraft in the Naval Air Service. A batch of 10 more floatplanes was ordered shortly after the start of the war and were delivered beginning in September through November. The FF.19's activities during the war are not well documented, but one aircraft was interned by the Dutch after it was forced to make an emergency landing near the island of Schiermonnikoog on 14 August.  

Several months later the British made their second attempt to attack the Zeppelin sheds that the Royal Navy believed to be at Cuxhaven on 24 November. Unlike the attempt the previous month which had been cancelled because of foul weather, the aerial attack on the Zeppelin base by the aircraft of the seaplane carriers of the Harwich Force was intended to bait the High Seas Fleet to sortie into the North Sea where they could be destroyed by the waiting Grand Fleet. The British ships had departed their bases on 23 November, but the aerial portion of the operation was cancelled on the evening of 23/24 November because the German battlecruisers were in the German Bight and the three seaplane carriers returned to port. The other ships continued on their mission with the Grand Fleet covering the Harwich Force as it sailed within visual distance of the island of Heligoland. Two seaplanes based on the island took off in response, although one was forced to return with engine trouble; the other aircraft, a FF.19, unsuccessfully attacked the light cruiser  with five bombs before the British returned to base.

The British returned for another try the following month with the carriers to be in a position north-east of Heligoland to hoist out their floatplanes on the morning of 25 December. The Germans had been alerted to the possibility of an imminent attack on their North Sea ports and were launching Zeppelins to search for any attackers that morning. A FF.19 on patrol spotted the Harwich Force after they had begun to move westward and had to return to Heligoland to deliver its report since it lacked a radio. The base alerted L.6 via searchlight to the presence of the British ships. As the Zeppelin attempted to close the range on the British, the carrier , the slowest of the carriers, was lagging behind.

Later that morning, after the carrier  had recovered the only aircraft to return to the carriers, the Harwich Force was again attacked by FF.19s from Heligoland. One aircraft dropped five bombs on destroyers and the other attacked a cruiser with two bombs, none of which hit their targets. During this operation one FF.19 remained airborne for five hours and 52 minutes.

Operators

Imperial German Navy

Specifications

See also

Notes

Footnotes

Bibliography

 

Friedrichshafen aircraft
Floatplanes